Sir Giuseppe Borg Olivier,  (2 November 1755 – 21 February 1831) was a member of the Supreme Council of Justice of Malta from 1815 to 1818 when he retired.

See also
 List of Chief Justices of Malta

References

1755 births
1831 deaths
19th-century Maltese judges
People from Valletta